Warschauer is a German-language toponymic surname literally meaning "of/from Warschau" (Warsaw). It may refer to:

People 
 Anna Warschauer (1841–1866), wife of Ludwig Passini
  (1855–1930), German historic, see State Archives in Gdańsk
 Claus Leon Warschauer (1929–2012), professor of University of São Paulo
  (1820–1888), Polish Jewish doctor
 Horst Warschauer (1919–1948), Nazi German army mayor
 Mark Warschauer (born 1954), professor at the University of California
  (1777–1835), merchant and banker
  (1816–1884), banker from Mendelssohn family
 Robert Warschauer junior (1860–1918), German banker

Places 
 Warschauer Straße, major thoroughfare in Berlin, Germany
 Berlin Warschauer Straße station, S-Bahn and U-Bahn in Berlin
 Warschauer Straße (Berlin U-Bahn)
 Oberbilker Markt/Warschauer Straße station, station in Düsseldorf, Germany
 Warschauer Allee, Bundesautobahn 2

See also 
 
 Warszawski
 Warschau (disambiguation)

German-language surnames
Toponymic surnames
Polish toponymic surnames
German toponymic surnames
Jewish surnames